Govarchin (also Romanized as Gūrchīn; also known as Govarchīn and Gövərçin) is a village in Mehranrud-e Markazi Rural District, in the Central District of Bostanabad County, East Azerbaijan Province, Iran. At the 2006 census, its population was 727, in 119 families.

References 

Populated places in Bostanabad County